The Phuket Gazette was a weekly English-language compact newspaper published in Phuket, Thailand by The Phuket Gazette Co. Ltd., at Gazette Square in Koh Kaew. The paper was established in 1993 by John Magee, and Rungtip Hongjakpet. With national distribution throughout Thailand, the newspaper was the largest English-language publication in or about Phuket, and ranked as the third largest English-language newspaper in Thailand.

The company's website, the Gazette Online, enjoyed a Google ranking of six, the highest for any site in or about Phuket, and its television business, PGTV, producer of the Phuket Today show, was Phuket's only national channel, covering the entire country through Thailand's mass communications organization MCOT and cable provider True Visions. Other Gazette media services include the popular comments board, the Phuket Forum, and Gazette Aviation, providing aerial promotions as well as management of the company aircraft, "News Dog". The Gazette was also a major media sponsor, often in cooperation with The Nation, for community events, including many that raise funds for local charities.

In July 2017, The Phuket Gazette Co. ceased operations. The Phuket Gazette's digital assets were acquired by Digital Broker Ventures, a Thailand based start up studio, who wasted no time digitising the company – shifting everything online; a new website, Social Media presence, a YouTube channel, forum and mobile applications. And the old print newspaper was replaced with a daily email newsletter.

The new Thaiger expanded beyond local Phuket news, going nationwide. In 2019 a Thai language offering was launched and has long since surpassed the readership of the English news, with local Thai’s coming to read about the latest news, sport, lottery and entertainment.

References

External links
 The Thaiger

Defunct newspapers published in Thailand
English-language newspapers published in Asia
Mass media in Phuket (city)
Publications established in 1993
1993 establishments in Thailand
2017 disestablishments in Thailand